Záviš Kalandra (10 November 1902 – 27 June 1950) was a Czechoslovak historian, theatre critic and theorist of literature.

He was born in Frenštát pod Radhoštěm. He studied philosophy at the Charles University in Prague and then in Berlin. In 1923 he joined the Communist Party of Czechoslovakia, but he was expelled due to his criticism of Stalin's policy. Kalandra criticized the Moscow Trials of 1936 and was expelled from the Communist Party.

He was arrested by the Gestapo in 1939 and imprisoned until 1945 in various concentration camps. After the war he was branded as a Trotskyist and accused of being the member of a supposed plot to overthrow the Communist regime. He was sentenced to death along with his co-defendants, Milada Horáková, Jan Buchal and Oldřich Pecl, on 8 June 1950, and executed by hanging.

References 

1902 births
1950 deaths
People from Frenštát pod Radhoštěm
Executed politicians
People executed for treason against Czechoslovakia
People executed by the Czechoslovak Socialist Republic by hanging
Communist Party of Czechoslovakia politicians
Recipients of the Order of Tomáš Garrigue Masaryk
Charles University alumni